Ben-Zion Witler (1907–1961), also Ben-Tsion Vitler, BenZion Wittler, was a Jewish singer, actor, coupletist, comedian and composer.

Early life
At the age of six Witler moved with his family from Belz, Galisia, to Vienna, where he received a strict Chasidic religious upbringing.

Career
In 1919, at the age of 12, he joined the Freie jüdische Volksbühne theater in Vienna (1919–1922; no connection to the New York Folksbiene), secretly and under an alias, fearing his family's reaction. He worked briefly as a journalist at the German Zionist weekly Wiener Morgenzeitung (Vienna Morning Times), but in 1926 returned to the Vienna theater scene, performing in comedies and operettas, studying opera repertoire with Yulianovsky and Fuchs, touring (Paris, London, South Africa, France and Vienna).

Witler spent three years in Poland in the mid-1930s, becoming a "public darling." In 1937 he appeared in Riga in A Khasene in Shtetl and The Galitzian Wedding by William Siegel. Some of his many other starring roles were in Yanko the Gypsy, A Millionaire's Caprice, The American Litvak, The Brave Officer, The Bandit Gentleman, The Strength of Love, The Bride with Three Brothers, The Golden Bridegroom, The Threshold of Joy, It's Hard to be a Jew by Sholom Aleichem, Ansky's The Dybbuk, Jacob Mikhailovich Gordin's God, Man and Devil, and David Pinski's Yankel the Smith.

Starting in 1940 he toured the U.S., playing at NYC's Hopkinson Theater in Siegel's Forgotten Women and Chicago's Douglas Theater in Siegel's A Golden Dream. In 1946 he toured Argentina, at Buenos Aires Mitre Theater in Kalmanovitsh's "Home Sweet Home." He performed with Argentinian-born actress Shifra Lerer, his wife, through North and South America, Israel, and South Africa through the 1950s.

Recorded songs
He recorded hundreds of songs; his hits included:
 Gelibte (Beloved)
 Dzhankoye
 Varshe (Warsaw)
 Akhtsik er, zibetsik zi (He's 80, She's 70)
 Byalostok
 Mayn alte heym
 Oyfn veg shteyt a boym
 Leb un Lakh
 Krokhmalne Gas
 Zing, Brider, Zing!
 Belz
Rozhinkes Mit Mandlen (Raisens and Almonds)

References

Further reading 
Dr. Khariton Berman, Yiddish Forward April 14, 1995, "Der Groyser Yiddisher Aktior, Ben Tsion Witler; Tsu Zayn Nintsikstn Geboyrn Yor".

External links
Guide to the Papers of Shifra Lerer and Ben-Zion Witler, YIVO Institute for Jewish Research, New York, NY

A couple of his albums on YouTube

1907 births
1961 deaths
20th-century Polish Jews
Jewish cabaret performers
Polish cabaret performers
Polish Zionists
Jewish composers
Jewish songwriters
Yiddish-language singers
Yiddish theatre performers
20th-century Polish poets
20th-century Polish  male singers
20th-century comedians
Jewish emigrants from Austria to the United States after the Anschluss